Sharif Atkins (born January 29, 1975) is an American actor. He is best known for his role as Dr. Michael Gallant on ER and for his role as FBI Agent Clinton Jones on White Collar.

Early life 
Atkins was born in Pittsburgh, Pennsylvania, and grew up in Chicago, Illinois.  He earned his bachelor's degree in theatre/speech from Northwestern University in 1997. While at Northwestern in 1996, Atkins was initiated as a member of the Kappa Alpha Psi fraternity (Theta Chapter). In 1998, he studied at the Los Angeles Performing Arts Conservatory (formerly PDAC), before getting his start in film and television.

Career 
He gained fame for his role as Dr. Michael Gallant, a character that debuted in the eighth season (2001) of the NBC medical drama ER.  He left ER after the 2003-2004 season. In 2004, he went on to star in the short-lived police drama Hawaii as former Chicago Police Department Detective John Declan, who transferred to an elite crime unit of the Honolulu Police Department. Atkins continued to make guest appearances in both the 2004-2005 and 2005-2006 seasons of ER, with his character returning on leave from duty in Iraq as a U.S. Army physician. His character was killed in Iraq at the end of the 2005-06 season. Atkins also portrayed the recurring character Gary Navarro in the acclaimed series The 4400. Navarro is a telepath. In 2005 Sharif played in the tv sitcom Eve. He played Shelly's boyfriend Grant.

Atkins played Special Agent Clinton Jones in USA Network's White Collar from 2009 to 2014.

He has appeared as Assistant United States Attorney Rivers in the CBS drama The Good Wife.  In 2009 he appeared in season 4, episode 25 of Criminal Minds - "To Hell..." as Sgt. William Hightower. Atkins has also guest-starred in season 8 of CSI: Miami.

In 2014 he appeared as a Nova Corps pilot in Guardians of the Galaxy.

In 2021 he began a recurring rule as Norman 'Boom Boom" Gates in NCIS: Hawai'i.

Filmography

Film

Television

References

External links
 

1975 births
Living people
African-American male actors
American male television actors
Male actors from Chicago
Northwestern University School of Communication alumni
Male actors from Pittsburgh
Whitney M. Young Magnet High School alumni
21st-century American male actors
21st-century African-American people
20th-century African-American people